Lestes simulatrix is a species of stalk-winged damselfly in the family Lestidae.

References

Further reading

 

Lestes
Articles created by Qbugbot
Insects described in 1895